Davenport Lake is a lake in the Dyer Gap area of Gilmer County, Georgia. It is a private lake. 
It also has bluegill, and other bream,
snapping turtles. It was built during the Great Depression.
It is a reservoir off of East Mountain town trail. East Mountain Town Creek and Harper Creek flow into it. East Mountain Town Creek flows out. It is in the Chattahoochee National Forest. It was built by the Civilian Conservation Corps

References

http://georgia.hometownlocater.com

Bodies of water of Gilmer County, Georgia
Reservoirs in Georgia (U.S. state)